Exercise is a disciplined activity that is meant to improve and maintain fitness, health and wellness.

Exercise may also refer to:

 Mental exercise, activity for mental fitness
 Military exercise, a military training activity
 Exercise (mathematics), training unit in mathematics
 Exercise (options), a financial or contracting term
 The Exercise, a 1968 play by Lewis John Carlino
 Exercises (album), 1972 by Nazareth
 Exercises (EP), a 2012 EP by CFCF

See also
Workout (disambiguation)

information about times and places when exercise was viewed negatively.

Throughout history, attitudes towards exercise have varied widely depending on cultural, religious, and societal factors. Here are some examples of times and places when exercise was viewed negatively:

Ancient Greece: Although the ancient Greeks are often praised for their athletic achievements, the emphasis on physical training was limited to men and boys, and only in certain classes of society. Women were generally discouraged from exercising, as it was believed that strenuous physical activity could damage their reproductive organs.

Victorian England: During the Victorian era, the upper classes viewed exercise as unladylike and ungentlemanly. It was thought that physical exertion could lead to an undesirable level of sweat, which was considered unhygienic and socially unacceptable. This attitude contributed to the popularity of sedentary activities like croquet and lawn tennis.

Early 20th century America: In the early 1900s, many people viewed exercise as a dangerous and potentially harmful activity. Some medical experts claimed that physical exertion could damage the heart and lungs, and that it could lead to physical and mental exhaustion. This attitude began to shift in the mid-20th century, as scientific research began to demonstrate the health benefits of regular exercise.

20th century communist countries: In some communist countries like the Soviet Union, the promotion of physical fitness was seen as a tool for building a strong, healthy, and productive workforce. However, some individuals viewed this emphasis on physical training as a form of state control and manipulation.

It's important to note that attitudes towards exercise continue to evolve, and what was viewed negatively in the past may not be seen as such today. Additionally, different cultures and communities may have varying attitudes towards exercise and physical activity.